Árni Árnason may refer to:

 Árni Már Árnason (born 1987), Icelandic Olympic swimmer
 Árni Páll Árnason (born 1966), Icelandic politician, former Minister for Social Affairs